Ashish Bhatia is a US-based Indian engineer with specializations in mobile security and social media, who developed Google's predictive response generation system. He is also an angel investor, public speaker and advocate for startups

Education
Bhatia earned a bachelor's degree in engineering in 2009 and a master's degree in computer architecture in 2011, both from IIT Kanpur.

Career 
He worked at Morta Security, a startup that was acquired by Palo Alto Networks in 2013. He has also worked as a software engineer at WhatsApp, on the Messenger team at Facebook, and the emerging markets team at Instagram. 

At Google, Bhatia was a founder member in 2010 of Google's Android app scanning team, known as Google Bouncer, and developed the predictive response generation system for personal responses. 

, he worked at a cryptocurrency startup while maintaining a GitHub repository on Android security. He has published on his blog threats such as the Facebook "April Fools Prank".

Publications 
 Deep Learning Projects with PyTorch. Packt Publishing, 2018. .

Patents 
 Automated generation of suggestions for personalized reactions in a social network
 Detecting pirated applications
 Methods and systems for handling recovery messages

References

External links 
 Personal website

American engineers
American computer programmers
Living people
Year of birth missing (living people)
Google employees
IIT Kanpur alumni